This was the first edition of the tournament, so no defending champions were declared.

Anna Smashnova won the title, defeating Tathiana Garbin in the final. Smashnova was leading 3–0 on the first set tiebreak, when Garbin suffered a heat illness during the match and decided to retire. It was the first title of the year for Smashnova and the 16th of her career.

Seeds

Draw

Finals

Top half

Bottom half

External links
 Main and Qualifying Draws

Internazionali di Modena